Darío Ariel Sarmiento (born 29 March 2003) is an Argentine professional footballer who plays as a winger for Montevideo City Torque, on loan from English club Manchester City.

Club career

Estudiantes
Sarmiento joined Estudiantes in 2009, after spells with Defensores de Bosques and Independiente. He made his debut in senior football at the age of sixteen, after manager Gabriel Milito promoted him into Estudiantes' first-team squad during the 2019–20 campaign. After going unused on the substitute's bench for Primera División fixtures with Patronato and Arsenal de Sarandí in September, Sarmiento's bow arrived on 5 October 2019 in a goalless draw at home to Huracán; replacing Diego García after sixty-seven minutes to become the club's second youngest debutant. Seven more appearances came in his breakthrough season.

On 31 December 2020, Estudiantes vice president Martín Gorostegui confirmed that transfer negotiations were underway with Premier League club Manchester City for Sarmiento; two days after the player had renewed his contract through to 31 December 2021.

Manchester City
On 30 April 2021, Estudiantes announced that Sarmiento would join Manchester City on 1 July, for a reported initial fee of £5.2million.

Girona (loan)
On 30 July 2021, Sarmiento was loaned to Spanish club Girona FC, also owned by the City Football Group, for one year.

International career
Sarmiento regularly featured for the Argentina U16s, including at the Montaigu Tournament and Torneo de Desarrollo; winning both competitions. He also appeared for the U17s under Pablo Aimar. In December 2020, Sarmiento received a call-up from the U20s.

Career statistics
.

Honours
Argentina U16
Montaigu Tournament: 2019
Torneo de Desarrollo: 2019

Notes

References

External links

2003 births
Living people
People from Florencio Varela Partido
Argentine footballers
Argentine expatriate footballers
Argentina youth international footballers
Argentina under-20 international footballers
Association football forwards
Argentine Primera División players
Segunda División players
Estudiantes de La Plata footballers
Manchester City F.C. players
Girona FC players
Montevideo City Torque players
Argentine expatriate sportspeople in England
Argentine expatriate sportspeople in Spain
Argentine expatriate sportspeople in Uruguay
Expatriate footballers in Spain
Expatriate footballers in England
Expatriate footballers in Uruguay
Sportspeople from Buenos Aires Province